Chintan Patel is an Indian industrialist and the managing director of the Deesan Group which functions in the textile industry. He is also the vice president of Shri Vile Parle Kelavani Mandal (SVKM) where he runs educational institutions like Mithibai College and Narsee Monjee Institute of Management Studies (NMIMS) in Mumbai.

Early life
Chintan Patel is the son of politician and the chancellor of NMIMS University Amrish Patel and Jayshree Patel. Chintan completed his graduation from Mithibai College, Mumbai. He is married to Hiral Patel.

Career 
Chintan founded Deesan Group alongside his father in 2004. He established a textile mill in 2004 with 24 looms, that manufactured bedsheet fabric. At present, the group has 1800 looms globally.

In 2007, Chintan set up Krushna Cortex Pvt Ltd which produces 72000 metric tons of terry towels and bathrobes annually. In 2013, he started Pramukh Cotex Pvt Ltd, which now manufactures 120 million meters of shirt fabric annually.

He is also the director of Deesan AgroTech. The company was incorporated in 1991.

Philanthropic Initiatives
Chintan Patel is a trustee of the Shirpur Education Society which was established by his family in 1979. It runs 85 educational institutes from pre-primary school to graduation. The society has been awarded by Maharashtra Government in 2003 for its contribution to the education sector.

Chintan along with his father has also initiated a rainwater harvesting program in their hometown Shirpur, where more than 1000 check dams have been constructed across Shirpur and adjoining areas of Maharashtra, under this initiative. This contributes to sustainable irrigation in drought-prone areas and provides 24x7 water for industries, farming, and other uses. His work is known as the ‘Shirpur Pattern’ across Maharashtra and has been implemented in Bengaluru and other cities of India as well.

Awards and recognition
2021:
 Philanthropist of the Year at Iconic Gold Award
2022: 
 Met Connect Social Entrepreneur of the Year Award for contribution to the field of water conservation.
 Global National Stardom of the Year Award for contribution to the Education Sector
2023: 
 Received Maharashtra Ratna Award along with his father Amarish Patel for their contribution to the social and education sector. The award was presented by Cabinet Minister Mangat Prasad Lodha

References

Living people
Indian industrialists
Businesspeople from Maharashtra
Year of birth missing (living people)